Inzar was a political group created with the union of the Communist Movement of Galicia and the Revolutionary Communist League of Galicia. It was constituted as political party in 1991 linked to Izquierda Alternativa. In 1993 it was integrated in the Galician Nationalist Bloc (BNG), having always little political weight in the bloc.

Inzar had 234 members (2002) when it finally became a "collective" inside the BNG. Xesús Veiga Buxán, who was an MP in the Parliament of Galicia, was it most-recognized leader.

Inzar announced its self-dissolution in 2012.

References

Defunct socialist parties in Galicia (Spain)
Galician nationalist parties
Feminism in Spain
Pacifism in Spain
Anti-war movement
Left-wing nationalist parties
Former member parties of the Galician Nationalist Bloc